This is a list of universities in Cameroon.

Public universities
University of Bamenda
University of Buea
University of Douala
University of Dschang
University of Maroua
University of Ngaoundéré
University of Yaoundé I
University of Yaoundé II
Universtity of Bertoua
University of Ebolowa
University of Garoua

Private universities
 Institut Universitaire Saint Jean du Cameroun(IUSJC)
St. Lawrence University, Cameroon
Fomic Polytechnic University
SwissLink Professional University- Kumba & Douala
 Biaka University Institute of Buea (BUIB)
 HIPDET University- Bamenda
 Kesmonds International University - (KIU) America
 Catholic University of Cameroon, Bamenda
 ICT University, Yaoundé
 Catholic University of Central Africa, Yaoundé
 Cosendai Adventist University, Nanga Eboko
 Dale Kietzman University
 Ecole Nationale Superieure Des Travaux Publics De Yaoundé
 Institut Universitaire du Golfe de Guinée
 International University, Bamenda
 Maflekumen Higher Institute Of Health Sciences
 Pan African Institute for Development – West Africa
 Saint Monica University  - The American International University, Buea, Cameroon
 Université des Montagnes, Bangangté
 Stalwart university institute, Douala
 ISSAB UNIVERSITY
Taniform university, Bamenda
Central University Institute Bamenda, CUIBa
HIHMATECH UNIVERSITY CAMEROON
Institut Agenla Academy
National Polytechnic Bamenda

References

Universities

Cameroon
Cameroon